Bidhya Chapagain is a Nepalese journalist. She is also a presenter of Herne Katha, a television web series started March 2018.

Career 
She worked as a presenter for Sajha Sawal, a weekly social discussion and debate program in Nepal. She began presenting the show in July 2014 and quit the show in January 2018, co-founding Herne Katha. Before that she was a producer for Sajha Sawal. She has worked as a journalist for over a decade in radio, television and newspaper media.

Early life 
Chapagain's childhood was spent with her parents in Gothatar, Kathmandu. She grew up helping her parents on their farm. She was inspired to become a journalist from listening to the radio with her brother and reading the newspaper in her school library. Her mother was only 13 when sher got married. Chapagain got a lot of support from her mother, who wanted her daughter to be well educated.

Impact 
She says that it is the family who motivates and encourages women and girls, and supports girls’ education. As a woman presenter she encourages women's participation and for questions to be asked in Sajha Sawal.

Awards 
The Man Who Died Once - 'Best Documentary Award' in Kathmandu International Mountain Film Festival (KIMFF 2018)
Directed by - Bidhya Chapagain and Kamal Kumar

References

External links 
 

Living people
Nepalese women
Nepalese journalists
People from Kathmandu District
Nepalese web series actresses
1983 births
Nepalese women journalists
Khas people